Redhills may refer to:
Redhills, Cumbria, a hamlet in England
Redhills, County Cavan, a village in Ireland
Redhills railway station (closed)
Redhills GFC, a Gaelic football club
Redhills, Devon, a suburb in Exeter, England
Redhills, Durham, headquarters of the Durham Miners' Association

See also
 Redhill (disambiguation)
 Red Hills (disambiguation)